West Essex can refer to:

 West Essex in the United States
 West of East Saxony in Germany
 West Essex in England
 West of the East of the Kingdom of Essex 
 Wessex
 Wessex culture in Ancient Britain
 Essex West (electoral district), Ontario, Canada
 West Essex (UK Parliament constituency) 1868–1885